Media of Timmins, Ontario includes:

Radio
With the launch of CFCL in 1952, Timmins became home to the first French-language radio station in Ontario. (The first French-language radio station in Canada outside of Quebec, CKSB, was launched in 1946 in Saint-Boniface, Manitoba.)

Currently, many of the city's radio stations simulcast stations from Sudbury for at least part of their broadcast day.

Defunct radio stations
CKTT-FM 94.3 (a tourist information station that was launched by 1311831 Ontario Limited in the early 2000s; it is unknown when the station left the air)

TV
Timmins is home to one television station which is locally licensed, CITO-TV. However, that station effectively acts as a satellite of Sudbury's CICI-TV as part of the CTV Northern Ontario system — the station's only direct local production is news reportage which airs as part of regional newscasts produced at the Sudbury station. The city formerly also had its own CBC Television affiliate, CFCL-TV. However, that station was acquired directly by the CBC in 2002, and became a straight analogue rebroadcaster of CBLT-DT from Toronto; the repeater would close down on July 31, 2012, due to budget cuts.

Timmins is not designated as a mandatory market for digital television conversion.

Cable

The cable television provider in the city is EastLink (formerly Persona Cable). The city's community channel is branded as EastLink TV. EastLink also produces a separate channel for real estate and advertising listings, branded as ClaimPost Realty.

Timmins is one of the few cities in Ontario whose cable provider carries an affiliate of the Quebec television network V (in this case, Montreal flagship CFJP-DT), which has only voluntary carriage rights outside of Quebec. In addition, Eastlink also carries Gatineau TVA affiliate CHOT-DT, instead of Montreal's CFTM-DT, which most cable systems outside of Quebec and Ottawa Valley carry; due to the region's large Franco-Ontarian community, Northern Cable, EastLink's predecessor in much of Northeastern Ontario, already carried CHOT long before TVA carriage became mandatory nationwide.

Print
 L'Express de Timmins  
 Les Nouvelles 
 Timmins Daily Press, owned by Osprey Media (Sun Media/Quebecor)
 The Timmins Times

Defunct
Porcupine Advance (March 28, 1912 – 1950)

References

Timmins

Media, Timmins